The Smart EQ Fortwo, formerly Smart Fortwo electric drive, smart ed or Smart Fortwo EV, is a battery electric vehicle variant of the Smart Fortwo city car made by Smart.

The Smart EQ Forfour is an electric variant of the larger Smart Forfour city car.

Field testing of the electric Smart Fortwo began in London with 100 units in 2007. The second generation was introduced in 2009 and was available in 18 markets around the world for leasing or through the Car2Go carsharing service in selected cities, with over 2,300 units delivered.

A near production version of the third-generation Smart ED was unveiled at the September 2011 Frankfurt Motor Show. Smart planned in 2012 to mass-produce the electric car for availability in up to 30 markets worldwide. Deliveries of the third-generation Smart ED began in the U.S. and Europe in May 2013. More than 8,800 units of the second and third generation Smart ED were sold in North America and Europe between 2009 and June 2014, of which, over 6,500 units are third generation variants.

Since 2017, the fourth-generation Smart Electric Drive is being sold. It corresponds to the third-generation ICE-powered Smart; this mismatch in the numbering of generations arose because the Smart ED2 and the Smart ED3 were both based on the second-generation ICE-powered Smart.

First generation

The first Smart electric drive vehicles were modified by Zytek Electric Vehicles. They were powered by a rear-mounted motor driving the rear wheels. It ran on 13.2 kilowatt hours of sodium-nickel chloride Zebra batteries.

Field testing began in London with 100 vehicles in 2007 and was available only for lease to corporate clients for £375 per month.

Specifications
Power: 30 kW (41 hp)
Economy: 12 kilowatt-hours per 100 kilometres (430 kJ/km or 190 W·h/mi)
Range: 
Recharge time (80%): four hours
Recharge time (100%): eight hours
Top speed:

Second generation
The second generation, Smart ED2, was introduced in 2009 to 18 markets with the objective to gather experience about how customers use and charge electric vehicles. Daimler initially planned to build 1,000 vehicles, but as demand exceeded the company's expectations, more than 2,000 Smart Fortwo electric drive cars were produced. The electric cars were available for leasing or through the Car2Go carsharing service in San Diego, Amsterdam and Vancouver. Production of the second-generation Smart Fortwo electric drive began in November 2009 in Smartville, Hambach, France. The Smart ED2s have a  lithium-ion battery provided by Tesla, Inc. and a powertrain provided by Zytek. The range of a fully charged battery is up to  under the New European Driving Cycle (NEDC) cycle.

As part of a three-phase roll-out program, phase two began with field testing in Berlin in December 2009 with 100 units out of 300 that will be deployed in Germany. For phase two 1,500 cars were produced, and field tested in Hamburg, Paris, Rome, Milan, Pisa, London, the English Midlands, Madrid, Zurich, Portugal, Denmark, the Czech Republic, Austria, Belgium and the Netherlands during the first half of 2010. In October 2010, 250 units were made available for field testing in several cities in the United States. Testing also was conducted in Canada; and in 2011 in selected markets in Asia.

Phase three of the program is mass production, which was scheduled to begin with the 2012 model year. In the United States sales were scheduled to begin in 2012 with the 2013 model year. In July 2011 an agreement was reached between Daimler AG and Robert Bosch GmbH to develop and produce innovative traction motors for electric vehicles. Based on this joint venture, Daimler planned to use the improved traction motors with the third generation of Smart electric drive cars scheduled to go on sale in 2012.

Specifications
Torque: 
Battery capacity: 16.5 kWh lithium-ion battery
Economy: 12 kWh/100 km, also reported to be 200 W·h/mi
Range:  on the (NEDC cycle)
Top speed: 
The lithium-ion battery pack took three hours to charge from 20 to 80 percent of its capacity with a standard 230 V outlet. It could also be charged using a common US household 120 V outlet. The car has a 3.3 kW on-board charger for this AC charging. Smart claims a  time of 6.5 seconds, the same as for the gasoline version.
It has a single fixed-gear ratio transmission and is about  heavier than a gasoline-powered Fortwo.

Markets and sales
Over 2,300 units of the second generation models were leased between 2009 and October 2012 in 18 markets around the world. Of these, 1,721 units were registered in Europe through October 2012, and 527 units in the U.S. through December 2012.

United States
The trial program in the US began in January 2011 with the first customer delivery in Washington, DC. This pricing is before taxes or any government tax credits or rebates available. The limited fleet of second-generation Smart Fortwo electric drive cars was introduced first in Portland, Oregon, Los Angeles, San Jose, California, Orlando, Florida, Austin, Detroit, Indianapolis and the Interstate 95 corridor between Washington, D.C. and Boston, including New Jersey and New York.  

In July 2011, Car2Go announced the deployment of a fleet of Smart EDs into carsharing service in San Diego before the end of 2011. When reserving the electric car online, San Diego Car2Go members are able to see the battery's state of charge, so if the customer wants to go for an extended drive, the option is available to find the right car for that trip. 

In November 2011 fleets of 300 Smart EDs each were deployed in San Diego and Amsterdam as part of the Car2Go service. , a total of 527 Smart EDs were registered in the US since January 2011, including 300 units deployed for Car2Go in San Diego.

Considering an energy consumption of 39 kilowatt-hours per 100 miles (22 MJ/km) and a conversion factor of 33.7 kWh of electricity being the energy equivalent of a US gallon of gasoline ( megajoules to the litre), the US Environmental Protection Agency officially rated the Smart ED combined fuel economy at 87 miles per gallon gasoline equivalent (mpg-e) (2.7 L gasoline equivalent/100 km; 104 mpg-imp gasoline equivalent),  city and  highway. According to Forbes, the American Council for an Energy Efficient Economy ranked the Smart ForTwo Electric Drive the "greenest" car for 2014.

France
A total of 152 Smart EDs were registered in France since 2010 through December 2012.

Third generation
The third-generation Smart electric drive, Smart ED3, was unveiled at the September 2011 Frankfurt Motor Show. Several features are controlled remotely through a smart drive application for the iPhone.

Online reservations were scheduled to begin in the fourth quarter 2011.

The third-generation Smart electric drive was released in the US in May 2013 with 60 units delivered that month. Sales in Europe also began in May 2013. Smart planned to mass-produce the electric car with availability in 30 markets worldwide.

In February 2014, Smart announced it would be offering the 2014 model year nationwide; the 2013 model was only available in CARB states.

Markets and sales
Global sales of the third generation model reached 4,130 units during 2013. The Smart ED 3 was the top selling plug-in electric car in Germany in 2013, with 2,146 units registered through December 2013, representing 32% of the 6,711 Smarts sold in the country. After the German market, European sales were led by France, with 478 units registered through December 2013. U.S. sales totaled 923 units through December 2013.

Global cumulative sales of the third generation variant reached 6,514 units up to June 2014, while combined sales of second and third generation reached 8,814 units . , combined sales of both generations reached 3,959 units in Germany, 2,542 units in the U.S. and 865 units in France.

Smart ForJeremy variation
The Smart ForJeremy is a version of Smart ForTwo electric drive designed by Jeremy Scott. It included bright white body colour, chrome-plated tridion cell, a wing made of transparent fibreglass and decorated with rocket-shaped elements that light up red, wider rear tyres and wider rear wheel arches, wheel rims are shaped like aeroplane propellers, bright chromium-plated "eyebrows" above its front headlights, chromium-plated top half of the mirror caps and the frame around the radiator grille, fine white nappa leather upholstery at instrument panel, seats and door trim; diamond stitching at seat insert areas and the centre panels in the doors, bright chromium-plated side air inlets.

The vehicle was unveiled on the eve of the LA Auto Show at Jim Henson Studios in Los Angeles, with music provided by the artist M.I.A.

Production version was planned in 2013 in limited quantities.

Specifications
Torque: 
Top speed of 
 0 to 100 km/h (0 to 60 mph) in 11.5 seconds and 0 to 60 km/h (0 to 37 mph) in 5 seconds
Battery capacity: 17.6 kWh lithium-ion battery by Deutsche ACCUmotive
Range: 
Miles per gallon equivalent: 122 MPGe city, 93 MPGe highway, 107 MPGe combined
 Artificial warning sounds for pedestrians automatically activated in the U.S. and Japan, and manually activated in Europe.

Fourth generation

The fourth generation model, based on the C453, was made available for sale in the US on 9 August 2017, as a 2017 model; European sales started earlier the same year. The gasoline model was no longer for sale in Canada and the US starting with the 2017 model year. With the new body and the Renault/Mercedes Edison Platform, it is available with electric drive and a 17.6 kWh battery. The charge rate is 7.2 kW. Also available as a cabriolet, it is the only current production electric convertible in the world.

The model was later renamed as Smart EQ Fortwo in 2018 as Daimler started to use EQ brand for electric car lineup.

A facelifted model was unveiled in 2019, for the 2020 model year.

Smart EQ Forfour

Starting from this generation, the electric Smart is also available as a 5-door hatchback. The Smart EQ Forfour is a battery electric variant of the Smart Forfour, powered by a 60 kW motor. Just like its ICE counterpart, it shares its platform with the Renault Twingo and is manufactured in Novo Mesto, Slovenia. The battery capacity is 17.6 kWh, out of which 16.7 kWh is usable. Its electricity consumption is 13.1 kWh/100 km, therefore equating to a range of 127.48 km.

Essential importance for Tesla Motors
Although Tesla Motors was not directly involved in the development of the final Smart ED3 purchase model, the Daimler partnership concerning the Smart ED2 was essential for Tesla. Elon Musk said at the 2016 Tesla shareholder meeting: "If we hadn’t done that [the Daimler cooperation], Tesla would have died because the Daimler partnership gave us credibility, that a major OEM was willing to work with us, and they also paid us for the [Smart ED2] development program which is really helpful from a revenue standpoint". "Without that investment, Tesla would have been game over".

Gallery

See also
Electric car
Government incentives for plug-in electric vehicles
List of electric cars currently available
List of modern production plug-in electric vehicles
Mini E
Plug-in electric vehicle
Smart Fortwo
Smart (marque)
Zero-emissions vehicle

References

External links

 smart (Official UK Community Site)
 Daimler second-generation smart ED press release
 smart.com – the smart ed
 Green Car Congress article
 Zytek Group's Smart EV project page

EV
Electric city cars
Production electric cars
Cars introduced in 2007